Magdaléna Štrompachová (née Magdolna Drescher; 23 September 1919 in Budapest – 17 November 1988 in Bratislava) was a Hungarian-Slovak painter and restorer. She founded a fine arts school with her husband Ludwig Strompach where she was a teacher (1964-1973) Many artists followed her classes, her children were among them.

Life
Magdaléna Štrompachová grew up in Baja. Her mother was an amateur pianist and her father was a violin teacher and player.

She studied at the Hungarian University of Fine Arts. In 1946, she moved to Prague with her husband, where she worked in a cinema studio, and in 1950 to Slovakia. From 1986 on, she lived between Budapest and Bratislava.

1919 births
1988 deaths
Hungarian emigrants
Czechoslovak painters
Conservator-restorers
Immigrants to Czechoslovakia
People from Baja, Hungary
Hungarian women painters